The Mayo Kébbi is a river in Central and West Africa. The river rises in Chad, then flows west into the Bénoué River. Mayo-Kébbi Prefecture in Chad is named for it. The Mayo Kébbi is the major outlet for Lake Fianga, shared between Cameroon and Chad.

In the past, the Mayo Kébbi served as the outlet of the paleolake Mega-Chad. The presence of African manatees in the inflows of Lake Chad is evidence of this, since the manatee is otherwise only in rivers connected to the Atlantic Ocean (i.e. it is not possible that it evolved separately in an enclosed Chad Basin). The grand scale of the Mayo Kébbi river course is also evidence of earlier overflow from Mega-Chad; the upstream catchment of today is far too small to have dug such a large channel.

References

Rivers of Cameroon
Rivers of Chad
Benue River
Lake Fianga
International rivers of Africa